Chris Carr (born Christos H. Karaberis, April 6, 1914 – September 16, 1970) was a United States Army soldier and a recipient of the United States military's highest decoration—the Medal of Honor—for his actions in World War II.

Biography 

Carr was born Christos H. Karaberis in Manchester, New Hampshire. He joined the Army from his hometown in October 1942 and by October 1, 1944, was serving as a sergeant in Company L, 337th Infantry Regiment, 85th Infantry Division. On that day and the following day, near Guignola, Italy, he single-handedly attacked and captured five German machine gun emplacements. For these actions, he was awarded the Medal of Honor a year later on November 1, 1945.
After the war, he legally changed his name from "Christos Karaberis" to "Chris Carr". He reached the rank of sergeant first class and served in the Korean War before leaving the Army.

Carr died at age 56 and was buried in Los Angeles National Cemetery, Los Angeles, California.

Awards and decorations

Medal of Honor 
Carr's official Medal of Honor citation reads:

Citation
Leading a squad of Company L, he gallantly cleared the way for his company's approach along a ridge toward its objective, the Casoni di Remagna. When his platoon was pinned down by heavy fire from enemy mortars, machineguns, machine pistols, and rifles, he climbed in advance of his squad on a maneuver around the left flank to locate and eliminate the enemy gun positions. Undeterred by deadly fire that ricocheted off the barren rocky hillside, he crept to the rear of the first machinegun and charged, firing his submachinegun. In this surprise attack he captured 8 prisoners and turned them over to his squad before striking out alone for a second machinegun. Discovered in his advance and subjected to direct fire from the hostile weapon, he leaped to his feet and ran forward, weaving and crouching, pouring automatic fire into the emplacement that killed 4 of its defenders and forced the surrender of a lone survivor. He again moved forward through heavy fire to attack a third machinegun. When close to the emplacement, he closed with a nerve-shattering shout and burst of fire. Paralyzed by his whirlwind attack, all 4 gunners immediately surrendered. Once more advancing aggressively in the face of a thoroughly alerted enemy, he approached a point of high ground occupied by 2 machineguns which were firing on his company on the slope below. Charging the first of these weapons, he killed 4 of the crew and captured 3 more. The 6 defenders of the adjacent position, cowed by the savagery of his assault, immediately gave up. By his l-man attack, heroically and voluntarily undertaken in the face of tremendous risks, Sgt. Karaberis captured 5 enemy machinegun positions, killed 8 Germans, took 22 prisoners, cleared the ridge leading to his company's objective, and drove a deep wedge into the enemy line, making it possible for his battalion to occupy important, commanding ground.

Commendations 
Carr's awards include the following:

See also 

List of Medal of Honor recipients for World War II

Notes

References 

1914 births
1970 deaths
United States Army personnel of World War II
United States Army personnel of the Korean War
United States Army Medal of Honor recipients
United States Army soldiers
World War II recipients of the Medal of Honor
Burials at Los Angeles National Cemetery
People from Manchester, New Hampshire